Mauro Fernández may refer to:

 Mauro Fernández Acuña (1843–1905), Costa Rican politician and lawyer
 Mauro Fernández (footballer, born 1989), Argentine football forward
 Mauro Fernández (footballer, born 1997), Uruguayan football defender

See also
 Mauro Fernandes (born 1953), Brazilian footballer and football manager